William Delves (1870 – 1908) was an English footballer who played at half-back for Burslem Port Vale between 1891 and 1893.

Career
Delves joined Burslem Port Vale in the summer of 1891, and made his debut at a friendly game at Newton Heath on 1 September 1891 – the match was abandoned with Vale down 2–1. Despite being a half-back, he played in goal for the Football League record 10–0 demolishing by Sheffield United at the Athletic Ground on 10 December 1892. With that most dubious honour and one Midland League, one friendly and two Football League appearances to his name, he was released at the end of the season.

Career statistics
Source:

References

1870 births
1908 deaths
People from Wolstanton
English footballers
Association football midfielders
Port Vale F.C. players
Midland Football League players
English Football League players